Megalocornea (MGCN, MGCN1) is an extremely rare nonprogressive condition in which the cornea has an enlarged diameter, reaching and exceeding 13 mm. It is thought to have two subforms, one with autosomal inheritance and the other X-linked (Xq21.3-q22). The X-linked form is more common and males generally constitute 90% of cases.

It may be associated with Alport syndrome, craniosynostosis, dwarfism, Down syndrome, Parry–Romberg syndrome, Marfan syndrome, mucolipidosis, Frank–ter Haar syndrome, crouzon syndrome, megalocornea-mental retardation syndrome etc.

Clinical features 
Eyes are usually highly myopic. There may be 'with the rule' astigmatism. Lens may be luxated due to zonular streaching.In rare cases, it might be associated with intellectual disabilities.

References

External links 

Megalocornea - eMedicine ophthalmology; May 15, 2009; Thomas A Oetting, MD, Mark A Hendrix, MD
An Infant With Enlarged Corneas - medscape

Congenital disorders of eyes